Robert Knowles is the name of:

Robert P. Knowles (1916–1985), American politician
Rob Knowles (born 1947), Australian politician
Captain Robert Knowles, a fictional character in Bernard Cornwell's Sharpe series
Robert Knowles (entomologist), see Timeline of entomology since 1900
Robert Knowles (parasitologist) (1883–1936), British parasitologist

See also
Robert Knolles ( – 1407),  English knight of the Hundred Years' War
Robert Knollys (disambiguation), same pronunciation